There are over 20,000 Grade II* listed buildings in England. This page is a list of these buildings in the county of Northumberland, by former districts prior to the 2009 structural changes to local government in England.

Northumberland

|}

See also
 :Category:Grade II* listed buildings in Northumberland
 Grade I listed buildings in Northumberland

Notes

References 
National Heritage List for England

External links

 
Northumberland
Lists of listed buildings in Northumberland